Gidesk (also Romanized as Gīdesk, Gīdesg, and Gidisk) is a village in Naharjan Rural District, Mud District, Sarbisheh County, South Khorasan Province, Iran. At the 2006 census, its population was 29, in 11 families.

References 

Populated places in Sarbisheh County